Ongjin Airport(옹진비행장) is an airport in Ongjin, Hwanghae-namdo, North Korea.

Facilities 
The airfield has a single grass runway 11/29 measuring 6650 x 164 feet (2027 x 50 m).  It is sited on the west coast of North Korea along the Korea Bay.

History 
During the UN occupation of North Korea in the Korean War, it saw some use under the designation K-17; however its coastal location may have made it unsuitable for regular use.  In 1971, some reconstruction activity occurred, but the airfield has still remained largely inactive.

References 

Airports in North Korea
South Hwanghae